Pagbabalik ng Probinsyano is a 1998 Filipino action film co-written and directed by Fernando Poe Jr., who also reprises his role as Kardo de Leon, the titular "Probinsyano". The film is a sequel to the 1996 hit "Ang Probinsyano". The sequel shifts its focus from drug trafficking in the first film, to illegal mining and indigenous peoples' rights to ancestral lands.

Plot
PLt Ricardo "Kardo" de Leon has been reassigned from his former post as the Chief of Police of Santa Marcela and is now Chief of Police of Marangani, a municipality inhabited by Maranganis, a tribe of Kalinga, whose people warmly adopted him as one of their own.

As Chief of Police of Marangani, Kardo now faces the twin threat of Allegre Mining and the Tawingan tribe. The former seeks to reopen a long dormant mine over the objections of the native Marangani tribe; the latter on the other hand, is locked in a bitter tribal war with the Maranganis and have been employed by Allegre Mining to harass the natives thus making it appear that attacks are in furtherance of the tribal war. Kardo survives attempts by Allegre to have him killed and after his adopted daughter Menchie is abducted, tracks her abductors down to the Allegre offices in Manila before returning to Kalinga to lead the villagers in storming the last holdouts of the Tawingans and Allegre's goons at the mine.

Cast
Fernando Poe Jr. as PLt. Ricardo "Kardo" de Leon
Anjanette Abayarri as Elaila
Daniel Fernando as Ayangwa
Lovely Rivero as Julie
Subas Herrero as Emilio Torralba
Paquito Diaz as Roque
Amado Cortez as PCol Bernardo
Ricardo Cepeda as Cortez
Roldan Aquino as Rodrigo
Melisse "Mumay" Santiago as Menchie Salazar
Berting Labra as Titong
Renato del Prado as Natong Luga
Usman Hassim as Oying
Maita Sanchez as Roselle
Jethro Ramirez as Roselle's husband
Ernie David as Estong
Chiqui Glori
Ben Sanchez
Rudy Castillo
Rene Carbon
Romy Mangliwan
Tony Bernal
Jett Javier

Awards and nominations

See also
 Ang Probinsyano (film)
 Ang Probinsyano

References

External links

1998 films
1998 action films
Films about twin brothers
Philippine action films
Philippine sequel films
Films directed by Fernando Poe Jr.